The Military Sea Services Museum, located at 1402 Roseland Avenue, Sebring, Florida, developed from the ideas of the members of Branch 173 of the Fleet Reserve Association (FRA). The members discussed "displaying their memorabilia to 'dress up' the building and promote the military sea services.".   The museum was established in 1998, with the "Grand Opening" occurring on Memorial Day, and contains artifacts and exhibits relating to the U.S. Coast Guard, U.S. Marines and U.S. Navy, including state flags, posters, military items, and sea services memorabilia.

The museum became a non-profit Florida Corporation in September 2000 only to experience extensive damage in 2004 from Hurricane Jeanne.  In April 2005, a contractor rebuilt most of the museum, which included a new addition, the "USS Highland Room".  The new "Grand Opening" occurred in  August 2005.

Photo gallery
See footnote

See also
Coast Guard Museum Northwest
Virginia Beach Surf & Rescue Museum
Port Orford Lifeboat Station Museum
Sleeping Bear Point Coast Guard Station Maritime Museum
U.S. Navy Museum
National Museum of the Marine Corps

Notes

External links
Military Sea Services Museum official website

History of the United States Coast Guard
Marine Corps museums in the United States
Naval museums in the United States
Maritime museums in Florida
Military and war museums in Florida
Museums in Highlands County, Florida
Museums established in 1998
Buildings and structures in Sebring, Florida